Birmingham Deritend was a constituency of the House of Commons of the Parliament of the United Kingdom from 1918 to 1950. It elected one Member of Parliament (MP) by the first-past-the-post system of election.

Boundaries 
Prior to 1918 the parliamentary borough of Birmingham (within its boundaries in 1885) was split into seven single-member divisions. Under the Representation of the People Act 1918 the city contained twelve divisions, one of which was Birmingham Deritend.

This division of Birmingham was composed of the City Council Wards of St. Bartholomew's, St. Martin's and Deritend as they existed in 1918. The St. Martin's and Deritend wards had previously been part of the Birmingham South constituency, and the St. Bartholomew's ward had previously been part of the Birmingham Bordesley constituency.

In the redistribution under the Representation of the People Act 1948 which took effect in 1950, the then Deritend and St. Martin's wards became part of Birmingham Sparkbrook, and the St. Bartholomew's ward became part of Birmingham Small Heath.

Members of Parliament

Election results

Election in the 1930s

Election in the 1920s

Election in the 1910s

Sources
 Boundaries of Parliamentary Constituencies 1885-1972, compiled and edited by F.W.S. Craig (Parliamentary Reference Publications 1972)

References

Parliamentary constituencies in Birmingham, West Midlands (historic)
Constituencies of the Parliament of the United Kingdom established in 1918
Constituencies of the Parliament of the United Kingdom disestablished in 1950